Antonio Alfonseca (born April 16, 1972) is a Dominican former relief pitcher. Alfonseca also played for the Florida Marlins (–), the Chicago Cubs (–), the Atlanta Braves, and the Texas Rangers.

He is known for having an extra digit on each hand and foot.

Biography

Alfonseca was originally signed by the Montreal Expos as a non-drafted free agent in July . On December 13, 1993, he was taken by the Florida Marlins from the Montreal Expos in the 1993 expansion draft. He made his debut during the 1997 season, and his rookie campaign saw him win a World Series ring with the Marlins.

At the end of the  season, Alfonseca had surgery to repair a herniated disc. Subsequently, the Marlins asked Alfonseca to lose 15 pounds to help to relieve stress on his back. At a weigh-in during  spring training, Alfonseca had a confrontation with Dale Torborg, the son of then manager Jeff Torborg, and a former professional wrestler.  While the Marlins denied any connection, shortly afterwards, on March 27, 2002, he was traded, along with Matt Clement, to the Chicago Cubs for Julián Tavárez, Ryan Jorgensen, Dontrelle Willis, and minor league pitcher Jose Cueto.

On September 2, 2003, while with the Cubs, Alfonseca was thrown out of a game for bumping an umpire with his stomach.  He was subsequently suspended for five games.

After the  season, he filed for free agency, and signed back with the Marlins, but in July , he suffered a right elbow injury and missed the rest of the season. He was released by the Marlins, signed with the Rangers, but after another mid-season elbow injury was released by them. He pitched for the Phillies in 2007 and for the Lancaster Barnstormers and Bridgeport Bluefish of the Atlantic League from 2009 to 2011.

Personal life
His nicknames are El Pulpo ("The Octopus"), The Dragonslayer, and Six-Fingers. He has six fingers on each hand and six toes on each foot, a condition known as polydactyly. His grandfather also had this trait. Alfonseca regards it with pride, as a kind of family emblem.

Alfonseca and his wife Rocío have two sons: Antonio, Jr. and Mark Anthony, and two daughters, Jenitza and Asia.

See also
List of Major League Baseball annual saves leaders

References

External links

Antonio Alfonseca at SABR (Baseball BioProject)
Antonio Alfonseca at Pura Pelota (Venezuelan Professional Baseball League)

1972 births
Living people
Atlanta Braves players
Bravos de Margarita players
Bridgeport Bluefish players
Charlotte Knights players
Chicago Cubs players
Dominican Republic expatriate baseball players in Mexico
Dominican Republic expatriate baseball players in the United States
Florida Marlins players
Frisco RoughRiders players
Gulf Coast Expos players
Iowa Cubs players
Jamestown Expos players
Jupiter Hammerheads players
Kane County Cougars players
Lancaster Barnstormers players
Major League Baseball pitchers
Major League Baseball players from the Dominican Republic
Mexican League baseball pitchers
National League saves champions
Oklahoma RedHawks players
People from La Romana, Dominican Republic
Pericos de Puebla players
Philadelphia Phillies players
Portland Sea Dogs players
Texas Rangers players
Toros del Este players
People with polydactyly
Dominican Republic expatriate baseball players in Venezuela
Azucareros del Este players
Estrellas Orientales players
Gigantes de Carolina players
Dominican Republic expatriate baseball players in Puerto Rico